State elections were held in South Australia on 29 March 1941. All 39 seats in the South Australian House of Assembly were up for election. The incumbent Liberal and Country League government led by Premier of South Australia Thomas Playford IV defeated the opposition Australian Labor Party led by Leader of the Opposition Robert Richards.

Background
Though the LCL was in minority government with 15 of 39 seats following the 1938 election, where 14 of 39 lower house MPs were elected as independents which as a grouping won more than either major party with 40 percent of the primary vote, the Playford LCL won a one-seat majority government following the 1941 election.

Turnout crashed to a record-low 50 percent, triggering the government to institute compulsory voting from the 1944 election.

Results

|}

See also
Results of the South Australian state election, 1941 (House of Assembly)
Members of the South Australian House of Assembly, 1941-1944
Members of the South Australian Legislative Council, 1941–1944
Playmander

References

History of South Australian elections 1857-2006, volume 1: ECSA
State and federal election results  in Australia since 1890

Elections in South Australia
1941 elections in Australia
1940s in South Australia
March 1941 events